Beautiful Days is a 2001 South Korean television drama series starring Lee Byung-hun, Choi Ji-woo, Ryu Si-won and Lee Jung-hyun. The drama is the first entry in director Lee Jang-soo's Heaven Trilogy which includes Stairways to Heaven in 2003 and Tree of Heaven in 2006. It aired on SBS from March 14 to May 31, 2001 on Wednesdays and Thursdays at 21:55 for 24 episodes.

Synopsis 
Similar to its drama contemporaries, Beautiful Days involves conflicts in family relationships, as well as a love triangle.

Lee Min-chul (Lee Byung-hun) returns from studying in the US, to take an active role in his father's prospering music business, Victory Records. It turns out that his father (Lee Jung-gil) was involved in unethical practices in the past, as well as the murder of the father of Min-chul's stepbrother, Sun-jae (Ryu Si-won).

Into the scene comes two girls from the orphanage, Yeon-soo (Choi Ji-woo) and Se-na (Lee Jung-hyun), who share a sisterly bond. Se-na gets inspired to become a pop star after a visit by the Victory Records boss on a charity event.

Years pass, and both girls arrive in Seoul to start their adult lives. However, they get separated. Yeon-soo finds a job working at Victory Records in hopes of one day meeting Se-na again and becomes involved in the lives of the stepbrothers, Min-chul and Sun-jae. Yeon-soo and Min-chul make a deal that they will help each other's siblings. Yeon-soo moves into Min-chul's family home as a tutor for his younger sister Min-ji (Shin Min-a), and Min-chul will help Se-na achieve her dream of becoming a singer. A complex drama unfolds, Min-chul and Sun-jae both fall for Yeon-soo. Yeon-soo chooses Min-chul, but their love is threatened by a terminal illness.

Cast

Main 
 Lee Byung-hun as Lee Min-chul
 Baek Sung-hyun as young Lee Min-chul
 Choi Ji-woo as Kim Yeon-soo
 Ryu Si-won as Lee Sun-jae - Min-chul's stepbrother
 Lee Jung-hyun as Kim Se-na - Yeon-soo's sister

Supporting 
 Shin Min-a as Lee Min-ji - Min-chul's sister
 Lee Yoo-jin as Kang Na-rae - Yeon-soo's roommate and co-worker
 Lee Jung-gil as Lee Sung-chun - Min-chul's father
 Lee Kyung-jin as Jung Myung-ja - Sun-jae's mother
 Ha Jae-young as Lee Young-jun - Sun-jae's father
 Lee Sang-woo as Oh Jung-hun - composer and Sun-jae's high school upperclassman
 Kim Dong-hyun as Min Kyu-suk - bodyguard/chauffeur
 Lee Hwi-hyang as Yang Mi-mi / Yang Kyung-hee - singer
 Lee Ae-jung as Shin Jae-eun
 Kim Chung
 Kil Yong-woo
 Yoon Gi-won
 Oh Seung-eun
 Kim Min-sang
 Psy as himself (cameo, ep. 15)

Production

Filming locations 
Many of the scenes were filmed on location in Seoul:
 The streets and area around Sinchon-dong and Ewha Womans University.
 Synnara Record (formerly Tower Records) in Changcheon-dong, near Sinchon Station, was used as "Victory Records."
 Café Pascucci in Apgujeong-dong was used as the office of "Muse Records" and venue where characters meet and talk.

Ending 
The original script had intended that the character of Yeon-soo would die, but in response to a flood of protest letters from anguished viewers, the drama lets her live. Sena went on to succeed as a singer.

Soundtrack 
 그때까지 안녕 - Zero
 약속 - Zero
 Heaven - Lee Jung-hyun
 약속 - Ryu Si-won
 그대뒤에서 - Zero
 For You - Zero
 그때까지 안녕 - Ryu Si-won
 언제나 오늘 처럼 - Various Artists
 꿈 - Lee Jung-hyun
 Missing You - Ryu Si-won
 Please
 상처 - Ryu Si-won
 너만을 위해
 부탁 - Zero
 Heaven (Music Video) - Lee Jung-hyun

International broadcast
The series aired in Japan on NHK in October 2004; it was popular and well received by Japanese viewers.

In Thailand first aired on Channel 3 every Fridays and Saturdays at 10:30 p.m., starting from January 6 to March 30, 2007.

Remake
An Indonesian remake was titled Cincin.

References

External links 
 Beautiful Days official SBS website 
 

2001 South Korean television series debuts
2001 South Korean television series endings
Seoul Broadcasting System television dramas
Korean-language television shows
South Korean romance television series
South Korean melodrama television series
Television series by Kim Jong-hak Production